The term Cloudster can refer to a number of different aircraft types:
Douglas Cloudster
Douglas Cloudster II
Pop's Props Cloudster
Rearwin Cloudster
Ryson ST-100 Cloudster
Simplex Aeroplanes Cloudster